Sir Albert Maori Kiki (21 September 193113 March 1993) was a Papua New Guinea politician. He was one of the founders of the Pangu Party, which demanded 'home rule leading to eventual independence' for New Guinea. Born in the Kerema district on the Papuan coast, he was brought up in the Protestant faith in the church of the London Missionary Society. In 1958 he married Elizabeth, a Roman Catholic, in one of the first mixed marriages in the Territory. Albert had been one of a small group of promising students selected by Dr. John Gunther, Director of Health, to study medicine at the Suva Medical School. When he failed his medical exams and was likely to be recalled, he switched his studies to become a pathology technician. On completion of his course, he returned and worked as a technician in the laboratory operated by Dr. Price in the Native Hospital at Ela Beach. His autobiography, Ten Thousand Years in a Lifetime, was published in 1968.

He was national secretary of the Pangu Party, and after the 1972 elections he entered parliament, and was appointed Minister for Lands and Environment in Michael Somare's government. He was deputy prime minister from 1975 until 1977.

References

Papua New Guinean writers
1931 births
1993 deaths
Pangu Party politicians